Lilliput Pallavolo is an Italian women's volleyball club based in Settimo Torinese and currently playing in the Serie B1.

Previous names
Due to sponsorship, the club have competed under the following names:
 Lilliput Settimo Torinese (2015–present)

History
The club was established in the 1980s and has female teams (girls, juniors, seniors) participating at local, regional and national competitions. The senior team played in the Series B2 and B1 during the 2000s. At the end of the 2014–15 season, the club won promotion to the Serie A2. After two seasons at Serie A2, the club declined its participation in the following season, opting instead to play the 2017–18 season in Serie B1.

Venue
The club plays its home matches at the Palazzetto dello Sport (also known as PalaSanBenigno) in Settimo Torinese. At 200 spectators capacity, it is the smallest venue in the Serie A2.

Team
The club last Serie A2 squad, Season 2016–2017, as of March 2017.

References

External links

 Official website 

Italian women's volleyball clubs
Sport in Piedmont
1980s establishments in Italy